The 1912 United States presidential election in Arizona took place on November 5, 1912, as part of the 1912 United States presidential election. State voters chose three representatives, or electors, to the Electoral College, who voted for president and vice president. In Arizona, voters voted for electors individually instead of as a slate, as in the other states.

This was the first presidential election Arizona participated in, as it had been admitted as the 48th state on February 14 of the same year. The state was won by Democratic Governor of New Jersey Woodrow Wilson, running with Indiana Governor Thomas R. Marshall, with 43.52% of the popular vote. Wilson defeated three other major candidates including former progressive Republican President Theodore Roosevelt who ran under the Progressive Party challenging then current Republican conservative President William Howard Taft and earning nearly 29% of the total vote. Another third party candidate, Eugene V. Debs ran under the Socialist Party of America garnering a large left wing voting base of 13%. President Taft finished an embarrassing fourth place at under 13% of the popular vote, the lowest support for a Republican nominee in Arizona state history due to his low approval ratings and a severe split in the GOP causing Democrat Woodrow Wilson to win the state despite receiving only 43.52% in total.   

In 1912, more than 87% of Arizonans voted for one of three economically left-leaning candidates – Woodrow Wilson, Theodore Roosevelt, and Eugene V. Debs. Only 13% of the state sided with conservative President William Howard Taft who moved further to the right during his one term presidency. Arizona also voted in large numbers for two major third party candidates; Theodore Roosevelt and Eugene Debs, both of whom won a combined 43% of the popular vote, nearly the same as Wilson's vote total. Roosevelt's 29.29% remains the best-ever third-party presidential performance in Arizona history.

Party division among Republican voters helped Wilson carry every single county in Arizona, winning all but three of them with less than a majority.

Had Roosevelt not split from his own party, President Taft would have earned a combined total of 42.03%, much closer to Wilson's 43.5% which would have made the race extremely narrow.

Arizona was one of only 14 states in which the combined total of Roosevelt and Taft would not have defeated Wilson. The others were the 11 former states of the Confederate States of America (Virginia, North Carolina, South Carolina, Georgia, Florida, Alabama, Mississippi, Louisiana, Arkansas, Texas, and Tennessee) as well as the border states of Kentucky and Oklahoma. This makes Arizona the sole non-southern or border state in which Wilson would have won over the combined Republican vote (though Arizonan territory was claimed by the Confederacy in the Civil War).

Beginning with this election, Arizona voted for every presidential election winner until 1960.

Results

Results by county

Notes

References

Arizona
1912
1912 Arizona elections